The Argentine Bridge Association is the national organisation charged with regulating and promoting the game of bridge in Argentina. Its headquarters are in Buenos Aires. It was founded in 1928. The current president is Silvia Elena and the vice president is Roberto Vigil.

The Argentine Bridge Association is affiliated with the World Bridge Federation.

Argentina is a top nation in bridge.

Board
 President: Jorge Campdepadrós
 Vice president:  Guillermo Lega
 Secretary: Enrique Boschetti
 Treasurer: Julio Alfonsin

The president and the vice president are elected for a 3-year term.

Argentine bridge players
 Gabino Alujas
 Maria José Rueda
 Hector Cambreros
 Roberto Vigil, ex vice president of the Argentine Bridge Association

See also
List of bridge federations

References

External links
Asociación del Bridge Argentino

1928 establishments in Argentina
Contract bridge governing bodies
Bridge